Jamal Salih is a former Iraq national football player and coach, and currently as a sports director for Sharjah FC, and has been in the role since march of 2018.

Career
He began his career as a player with Al-Omma Sports Club. He helped guide Al-Jamiea (merged with Al-Talaba in 1978) to the top division in 1970 with the likes of Qusai Abdul-Sattar and Shamil Kamil, and became head coach of the club in 1974.

He went on to coach Al-Rasheed, Al-Nafat, the Iraqi army national side and several clubs in Libya and the UAE. He holds a PhD in Sports Pedegogy from Pittsburgh University.

Doctor Jamal Salih is one of the most historic coaches in the Iraqi Premier League, due to the three trophies that he collected as a manager in the 80's.

Later on, he worked as a pundit for Dubai Sports channel for their Bundesliga matches.

On March 4 of 2018, Doctor Jamal Salih was appointed as the sports director of Sharjah FC, and also Salih was responsible for the sports activities in the club. Also on the same day, Sharjah FC formed a technical committee that Doctor Jamal Salih was held president of.

Salih is one of the members of great achieves for Sharjah FC, a UAE Pro League in the 2018–2019 season (the first premier league for the club since 1996 in a historic success). And also the UAE Super Cup in 2019 UAE Super Cup.

Honours As a Manager
Al-Talaba SC
Iraqi Premier League: 81–82

Al-Rasheed SC
Iraqi Premier League: 87–88

Al-Rasheed SC
Iraqi Premier League: 88–89

References

Sportspeople from Baghdad
Iraqi footballers
Iraqi football managers
Iraq national football team managers
Living people
1946 births
Association football forwards